The Fidelitas is the youth organization of the conservative Fidesz party, founded in October 1996.

Presidents

References

External links
Official webpage

Fidesz
Youth wings of political parties in Hungary
1996 establishments in Hungary